Clivina cribrosa is a species of ground beetle in the subfamily Scaritinae. It was described by Jules Putzeys in 1868.

References

cribrosa
Beetles described in 1868